Tomáš Malínský (born 25 August 1991) is a professional Czech football player who currently plays for Jablonec.

Career
In the summer of 2020, he joined Slavia Prague for a fee of €400,000 on a three-year deal.

On 14 January, 2021, Malínský moved to Mladá Boleslav, on a loan until the end of the season.

Career statistics

International

References

External links
 

1991 births
Living people
Czech footballers
Czech Republic international footballers
Czech First League players
FC Hradec Králové players
Association football forwards
FC Slovan Liberec players
SK Slavia Prague players
People from Skuteč
FK Mladá Boleslav players
FK Jablonec players
Sportspeople from the Pardubice Region